Serpico is a film based on Frank Serpico

Serpico  also may refer to:
 Topics related to the police officer who inspired the film:
Frank Serpico, New York Police Department officer 
Serpico, a biography of Frank Serpico by Peter Maas
Serpico (TV series), the television series based on Serpico's life and the film
Terry Serpico, an American actor
 Serpico, a fictional character in Berserk (manga)
 Sérpico, an alias of Argentine naval officer Ricardo Miguel Cavallo
 Serpico (band), Scottish metal band